Bryan Craig Proby (November 30, 1971) is a former American football defensive lineman. He played college football at Arizona State. He was drafted in the sixth round (202nd overall) of the 1995 NFL Draft by the Kansas City Chiefs.

After football
In July 2010, Proby opened a barbecue restaurant, Big Belly's BBQ, in Tempe, Arizona. The restaurant has since closed.

References

1971 births
Living people
Arizona State Sun Devils football players
American football defensive linemen
Kansas City Chiefs players
Scottish Claymores players